Prowler in the Yard is the second studio album by American grindcore band Pig Destroyer. It was released on July 24, 2001, on Relapse Records. The album follows a dark and twisted story of love, obsession, and gore. The booklet also features an extra page of prose about the protagonist and "Jennifer". The album was recorded on an 8-track in drummer Brian Harvey's basement. In March 2009, Terrorizer named the album the third best American grindcore release of all time.

Bobby Steele of Misfits and The Undead is featured as the person on the front cover.

2015 remixed reissue 
In July 2015, Relapse Records announced that they would be reissuing Prowler in the Yard with remixed and remastered audio, a variety of 2CD and vinyl formats, and exclusive content including photos, liner notes, and an unreleased track.

The 2015 remix omits "Evacuating Heaven". Scott Hull explains in the liner notes that an entire vocal track was missing from the archives during the remixing process, instead of re-recording vocals the band decidedly omitted the song altogether. Additionally, the Jennifer "postlogue" that was at the end of Piss Angel was given its own track ID, separating it from the previous song.

Track listing

Personnel

Pig Destroyer
Brian Harvey – drums
J. R. Hayes – vocals
Scott Hull – guitars

Production
Paul Booth – cover art
Matthew F. Jacobson – executive production
Scott Kinkade – photography
Jonathan Canady – design

References

2001 debut albums
Pig Destroyer albums
Concept albums